James Anthony John Clarke (born 17 November 1989) is an English footballer who plays as a defender for Newport County.

Career
Clarke began his career at Oxford United making his debut by playing the full 90 minutes in a 2–0 Conference win at Kidderminster Harriers on 24 November 2007. He made 18 league appearances in his first season, and was sent off for two bookings in a 0–3 home defeat to Burton Albion on 8 March 2008.

He played 14 league matches in the ensuing campaign, but received a straight red card in the opening game, a 3–0 defeat at Barrow on 8 August 2008. On 27 February 2009, with his contract terminated by mutual consent, he joined Southern Football League Premier Division team Oxford City for the rest of their 2009 campaign, and from 2012 to 2014 he signed for Salisbury City after an unsuccessful trial at League one side Yeovil Town.

With Salisbury in financial distress, Clarke left for Woking, also of the Conference, on an undisclosed contract. He made his debut on 9 August as they opened the season with a 3–1 win at Alfreton Town, and made 30 appearances across the campaign.

Bristol Rovers

On 11 June 2015, with his contract expired, he signed for Bristol Rovers, newly promoted back into The Football League. He made his debut for the club on 8 August, as they began the League Two season with a 0–1 home defeat to Northampton Town. Clarke ended the season with several first team appearances as he provided a helpful role in Rovers' 3rd-place finish to receive promotion into the Football League One. In the same summer, Clarke signed a contract extension along with several other teammates.

Clarke scored his first professional goal in a 2–1 victory over Wycombe Wanderers at the start of the 2018–19 season before he scored his second goal with a 95-minute winner in a 2–1 victory over Fleetwood Town.

Walsall
Clarke was offered a new contract at Bristol Rovers at the end of the 2018–19 season and despite being offered an improved two-year contract, he opted to follow former boss Darrell Clarke to Walsall having worked under him at Salisbury and Rovers on a deal worth £104,000 per year. Clarke made his debut on the opening day of the season, scoring the only goal as Darrell Clarke got off to a winning start against Northampton Town. His impressive start with the club continued and after scoring two goals in the month, he was awarded the League Two Player of the Month award for September 2019. One of these goals was a 30-yard screamer against Crawley Town that won him the league's Goal of the Month award.

At the end of the 2020–21 season, Clarke was one of eight players to not be offered a new contract and would therefore depart the club at the expiration of their contract.

Newport County
In June 2021 he joined Newport County on a one-year deal. He made his debut for Newport on 7 August 2021 as a first half substitute in the 1-0 League Two win against Oldham Athletic. On 18 September 2021, Clarke scored his first goal for the club with an 87th minute winner against former club Walsall, assisted by another former Walsall teammate Cameron Norman. In May 2022 Clarke's contract at Newport was extended until the end of the 2022-23 season.

Career statistics

Honours
Individual
 EFL League Two Player of the Month: September 2019

References

External links
 
 

1989 births
Living people
Sportspeople from Aylesbury
English footballers
Association football defenders
Oxford United F.C. players
Oxford City F.C. players
Salisbury City F.C. players
Woking F.C. players
Bristol Rovers F.C. players
Walsall F.C. players
Newport County A.F.C. players
National League (English football) players
Southern Football League players
English Football League players
Footballers from Buckinghamshire